Skrwa Lewa (Left Skrwa; in Polish also Skrwa Lewobrzeżna or Skrwa Południowa) is a river of Poland, a left tributary of the Vistula.  It flows through the Gostynin-Włocławek Landscape Park, and from the town of Gostynin to its mouth it is a kayaking area.

Its counterpart the Skrwa Prawa (Right Skrwa) joins the Vistula about three miles downstream on the opposite bank.

Rivers of Poland
Rivers of Masovian Voivodeship